The Treaty of Frederiksborg was a treaty signed at Frederiksborg Castle, Zealand, on 3 July 1720 (14 July 1720 according to the Gregorian calendar), ending the Great Northern War between Denmark-Norway and Sweden.

History
The  Danish-Swedish part of the conflict began in 1700 but peace was restored the same year. Denmark-Norway rejoined the war in 1709 in a campaign to regain their lost provinces; Scania, Blekinge and Halland. However the Swedish general Magnus Stenbock managed to defend the provinces without presence of the king, Charles XII. On other fronts Sweden was not so lucky, primarily at the hands of Russia in 1721, and the destruction of the Swedish army from Stralsund, Swedish Pomerania.

Sweden paid 600,000 Riksdaler in damages (as deposit for this money, Denmark-Norway temporary had held Wismar, in Swedish Pomerania), broke her alliance with Holstein and forfeited her right to duty-free passage of Øresund. Denmark-Norway also gained full control over Schleswig, while Danish-held areas of Swedish Pomerania were returned to Sweden. The Treaty of Copenhagen from 1660, Malmö Recess 1662, Treaty of Fontainebleau (1679) and Stockholm also in 1679 (known as Peace of Lund) was now ratified for the fifth time.

Sources

References

Bibliography

External links
 scan and transcription of the treaty, in French, hosted by IEG Mainz

Frederiksborg
Frederiksborg
1720 in Denmark
Frederiksborg
1720 treaties
Treaties involving territorial changes
Treaties of Denmark–Norway
1720 in Sweden